Delea is a surname. Notable people with the surname include:

 James Delea (1868–1950), Irish hurler 
 Kathleen Delea, Irish camogie player
 Paddy Delea (1900–1969), Irish hurler

See also
 Dunlea, surname
 Delea, a village in Zăpodeni Commune, Vaslui County, Romania